Ackerman House may refer to:

United States
(alphabetically by state, then town)
Ackerman-Boyd House, Franklin Lakes, New Jersey, listed on the National Register of Historic Places (NRHP) in Bergen County
Van Houten-Ackerman House (Franklin Lakes, New Jersey), listed on the NRHP in Bergen County
Ackerman-Hopper House, Glen Rock, New Jersey, listed on the NRHP in Bergen County
Ackerman-Demarest House, Ho-Ho-Kus, New Jersey, listed on the NRHP in Bergen County
Ackerman House (222 Doremus Avenue, Ridgewood, New Jersey), listed on the NRHP in Bergen County
Ackerman House (252 Lincoln Avenue, Ridgewood, New Jersey), listed on the NRHP in Bergen County
David Ackerman House, Ridgewood, New Jersey, listed on the NRHP in Bergen County
Ackerman-Van Emburgh House, Ridgewood, New Jersey, listed on the NRHP in Bergen County
Ackerman-Zabriskie-Steuben House, River Edge, New Jersey, listed on the NRHP in Bergen County
Ackerman-Outwater House, Rutherford, New Jersey, attached to the Yereance-Kettel house
Ackerman House (Saddle River, New Jersey), listed on the NRHP in Bergen County
Abram Ackerman House, Saddle River, New Jersey, listed on the NRHP in Bergen County
Garret and Maria Ackerman House, Saddle River, New Jersey, listed on the NRHP in Bergen County
Garret Augustus Ackerman House, Saddle River, New Jersey, listed on the NRHP in Bergen County
Ackerman-Dater House, Saddle River, New Jersey, listed on the NRHP in Bergen County
Ackerman-Dewsnap House, Saddle River, New Jersey, listed on the NRHP in Bergen County
Ackerman-Smith House, Saddle River, New Jersey, listed on the NRHP in Bergen County
Van Horn-Ackerman House, Wyckoff, New Jersey, listed on the NRHP in Bergen County
Van Houten-Ackerman House (Wyckoff, New Jersey), listed on the NRHP in Bergen County